is a passenger railway station  located in the town of Daisen, Tottori Prefecture, Japan. It is operated by the West Japan Railway Company (JR West).

Lines

Station layout
The station consists of two opposed ground-level side platforms, connected to the station building by a footbridge.The station is unattended. The station buildings built to the same design as Tomari Station on the same line.

Platforms

Adjacent stations

History
Yodoe Station opened on November 1, 1902. With the privatization of the Japan National Railways (JNR) on April 1, 1987, the station came under the aegis of the West Japan Railway Company.

Passenger statistics
In fiscal 2018, the station was used by an average of 442 passengers daily.

See also
List of railway stations in Japan

References

External links 

 0640726 Yodoe Station from JR-Odekake.net 

Railway stations in Tottori Prefecture
Stations of West Japan Railway Company
Sanin Main Line
Railway stations in Japan opened in 1902
Yonago, Tottori